U Kyaw Myint (born c. 1945) also known as May Flower Kyaw Win is a noted Burmese businessman and political figure. He is one of the wealthiest tycoons in Burma and is one of the country's leading industrialists and bankers. He is the director-general of the Directorate of Industry under the Ministry of Industry of Burma.

Biography

Kyaw Win is also involved in the following associations and businesses. He is Managing Director of Chin-Su Co, Ltd; Chairman of Chin-Su May Flower Plywood Industry; Chairman of TN Resources Pte Co, Ltd (Singapore); Chairman, of Pathum Thani Saw Mill Co, Ltd, (Thailand); and Managing Director of Yangon Airways. He has connections with the Asian Development Bank and important top ranking government officials, including General Maung Aye.

In 2004 he negotiated the building of a series of new pulp factories across several states of Burma including in Ponnagyun in Rakhine State which will consume nearly 900,000 tonnes of bamboo a year, and Thabaung township in Ayeyarwady Division which will begin commercial production at 200 tonnes a year and several other areas. The decision was part of a bilateral cooperation plan between the Ministry of Industry in Burma and China Metallurgical Construction Corporation signed during the visit of General Khin Nyunt, to China from July 11 to 17 in which U Kyaw Myint was also a member of the delegation.

Connection to Opium Production
Kyaw Myint is allegedly the head of the Chinese-staffed and Burma Army-supported People Militia Force (Bi Thu Sit or Ta Ka Sa Pha), an organization that oversees the production and trafficking of opium and heroin.  Myint is behind the rise in opium production in Myanmar's Shan State since 2010.

References

20th-century Burmese businesspeople
Burmese politicians
Burmese people of Chinese descent
Living people
People from Shan State
1945 births